The Southern Downs Region is a local government area in the Darling Downs region of Queensland, Australia, along the state's boundary with New South Wales. It was created in 2008 from a merger of the Shire of Warwick and the Shire of Stanthorpe.

It has an estimated operating budget of A$22.8 million.

History 
The majority of the former Warwick Shire is home to the Githabul people who have lived around this area for tens of thousands of years before the arrival of Europeans in the early 1840s.

The current area of the Southern Downs Region existed as two distinct local government areas:

 the Shire of Warwick; which in turn consisted of four previous local government areas:
 the City of Warwick;
 the Shire of Allora;
 the Shire of Glengallan;
 the Shire of Rosenthal;
 and the Shire of Stanthorpe.

The City of Warwick came into being as the Warwick Municipality on 25 May 1861 under the Municipalities Act 1858, a piece of New South Wales legislation inherited by Queensland at its separation two years earlier. On 21 July 1869, the Municipality of Allora was established under the Municipal Institutions Act 1864.

On 11 November 1879, the Clifton, Glengallan and Stanthorpe Divisions were created as three of 74 divisions within Queensland under the Divisional Boards Act 1879. In 1886, Rosenthal was created out of parts of Glengallan.

With the passage of the Local Authorities Act 1902, Warwick and Allora became Towns and the four Divisions became Shires. On 23 January 1915 the Town of Allora was abolished and a new Shire of Allora was created from the southern part of the Shire of Clifton.

On 4 April 1936, Warwick was proclaimed a city.

On 21 November 1991, the Electoral and Administrative Review Commission, created two years earlier, produced its second report, and recommended that local government boundaries in the Warwick area be rationalised. The Local Government (Allora, Glengallan, Rosenthal and Warwick) Regulation 1994 was gazetted on 20 May 1994. On 25 June, an election was held for the new Shire of Warwick, and on 1 July 1994, the original entities passed out of existence. Stanthorpe was unaffected by these changes.

In July 2007, the Local Government Reform Commission released its report and recommended that Warwick and Stanthorpe amalgamate. It noted that Warwick was the regional centre for the region, with the maximum travelling time between Warwick and any other town being one hour. Both councils opposed the amalgamation citing cultural differences and different river catchment areas and economic drivers. On 15 March 2008, the two Shires formally ceased to exist, and elections were held on the same day to elect eight councillors and a mayor to the Regional Council.

Wards
The council remains undivided and its elected body consists of eight councillors and a mayor, elected for a four-year term.

Mayors 
 2008–2012 : Ron Bellingham 
 2012–2016: Peter Blundell 
 2016–2020: Tracy Dobie 
2020–present: Victor Frank Pennisi

Towns and localities 
The Southern Downs Region includes the following settlements:

Warwick region

Warwick area:
 Warwick

Allora area:
 Allora
 Berat
 Clintonvale
 Deuchar
 Ellinthorp
 Goomburra
 Hendon
 Mount Marshall
 Talgai
 Willowvale*

Glengallan area:
 Killarney
 Canningvale
 Danderoo
 Elbow Valley
 Emu Vale
 Freestone
 Gladfield
 Glengallan
 Junabee
 Loch Lomond
 Maryvale
 Morgan Park
 Mount Colliery
 Mount Sturt
 Mount Tabor
 Sladevale
 Swanfels
 Tannymorel
 The Falls
 Tregony
 Wiyarra
 Womina
 Yangan

Rosenthal area:
 Rosenthal Heights
 Allan
 Cunningham
 Dalveen
 Greymare
 Karara
 Leslie
 Leslie Dam
 Leyburn
 Palgrave
 Pratten
 Rosehill
 Thane
 Wheatvale

* - not to be confused with Willow Vale, Queensland

Stanthorpe region
 Stanthorpe
 Amiens
 Applethorpe
 Ballandean
 Broadwater
 Cottonvale
 Dalcouth
 Diamondvale
 Eukey
 Glen Aplin
 Greenlands
 Kyoomba
 Lyra
 Messines
 Mingoola
 Nundubbermere
 Passchendaele
 Pikedale
 Pikes Creek
 Pozieres
 Severnlea
 Somme
 The Summit
 Thorndale
 Wallangarra
 Wyberba

Libraries 
The Southern Downs Regional Council operates public libraries at Allora, Stanthorpe, and Warwick. It also operates a mobile library servicing Dalveen, Karara, Killarney, Leyburn, Maryvale, Pratten, Wheatvale and Yangan.

Population
The populations given relate to the component entities prior to 2008. The next census, due in 2011, will be the first for the new Region.

References

 
Southern Downs
Darling Downs
2008 establishments in Australia